Digrammia ocellinata, the faint-spotted angle or locust looper, is a moth of the  family Geometridae. The species was first described by Achille Guenée in 1857. It is found in the eastern United States, Quebec and Ontario.

The wingspan is 21-27  mm. The wings are brownish gray, faintly mottled. There is brown shading on the forewing, extending onto the hindwing.

Adults are on wing from April to October.

The larvae feed on the leaves of Robinia pseudoacacia and Gleditsia triacanthos.

References

External links

Moths described in 1857
Macariini